Giuseppe Forlivesi (28 March 1894 – 3 January 1971) was an Italian footballer who played as a forward. He competed for Italy in the men's football tournament at the 1920 Summer Olympics.

References

External links
 

1894 births
1971 deaths
Italian footballers
Italy international footballers
Olympic footballers of Italy
Footballers at the 1920 Summer Olympics
Footballers from Veneto
Association football forwards
Hellas Verona F.C. players
Modena F.C. players
Pisa S.C. managers
Italian football managers
Sportspeople from the Province of Verona